Ali Asghar Manda is a Pakistani politician who was a Member of the Provincial Assembly of the Punjab, from 2008 to May 2018.

Early life and education
Manda was born on 8 September 1966 in Sheikhupura. He has a degree of Master of Arts  in Political Science from University of the Punjab which he obtained in 1993 and has a degree of Bachelor of Laws  LL. B.  which he obtained in 1996 from Quaid-e-Azam Law College in Lahore.

Political career

Manda ran for the seat of the Provincial Assembly of the Punjab as a candidate of Islami Jamhoori Ittehad (IJI) from Constituency PP-135 (Sheikhupura-II) in 1988 Pakistani general election but was unsuccessful. He received 589 votes and lost the seat to Chaudhry Bashir Ahmed, a candidate of Pakistan Peoples Party (PPP). In 1993 Pakistani general election, he ran for the seat of the Provincial Assembly of the Punjab as an independent candidate from Constituency PP-135 (Sheikhupura-II) in but was, again, unsuccessful. He received 62 votes and lost the seat to Chaudhry Bashir Ahmed, a candidate of PPP. Later, he ran for the seat of the Provincial Assembly of the Punjab as an independent candidate from Constituency PP-165 (Sheikhupura-IV) in 2002 Pakistani general election but was unsuccessful. He received 71 votes and lost the seat to Jehanzaib Rao, a candidate of Pakistan Muslim League (N) (PML-N).

In 2008 Pakistani general election, Manda was elected to the Provincial Assembly of the Punjab as a candidate of PML-N from Constituency PP-165 (Sheikhupura-IV). He received 21,153 votes and defeated Javaid Nasarullah, an independent candidate. He was re-elected to the Provincial Assembly of the Punjab as an independent candidate from Constituency PP-165 (Sheikhupura-IV) in 2013 Pakistani general election. He received 37,741 votes and defeated Sahabzada Mian Saeed Ahmad Sharqpuri, a candidate of PML-N. In the same election, he ran for the seat of the National Assembly of Pakistan as an independent candidate from Constituency NA-132 (Sheikhupura-II-cum-Nankana Sahib) but was unsuccessful. He received 199 votes and lost the seat to Rana Tanveer Hussain. He joined PML-N in May 2013.

In December 2013, Manda was appointed as Parliamentary Secretary for  Services & General Administration Department. In April 2018, he quit PML-N. In May 2018, he joined Pakistan Tehreek-e-Insaf (PTI).

References

Living people
Punjab MPAs 2013–2018
1966 births
Pakistan Muslim League (N) MPAs (Punjab)
Punjab MPAs 2008–2013